Chathura Lakshan (born 30 March 1995) is a Sri Lankan cricketer. He made his Twenty20 debut for Galle Cricket Club in the 2017–18 SLC Twenty20 Tournament on 24 February 2018. He made his List A debut on 26 March 2021, for Galle Cricket Club in the 2020–21 Major Clubs Limited Over Tournament.

References

External links
 

1995 births
Living people
Sri Lankan cricketers
Galle Cricket Club cricketers
Sportspeople from Galle